The 2011 Carolina Panthers season was the franchise's 17th season in the National Football League and the first season for Ron Rivera as head coach. In Week 16 of the 2010 season, the team clinched the NFL's worst record of that year and was given the #1 pick in the 2011 NFL Draft, with which the team selected Auburn quarterback Cam Newton, the 2010 Heisman Trophy winner. They improved on their 2–14 record from 2010, and finished 6–10, missing the playoffs for the third year in a row.

Despite their losing record, Carolina made many improvements. According to Football Outsiders, the Panthers had the biggest year-to-year offensive improvement in their history: they were dead last in 2010, and moved up to 4th offensively in 2011, according to Football Outsiders statistical formulas. In addition, Football Outsiders states that Carolina had the best running game in their calculations' history. This was due to the addition of Cam Newton's running ability to the high-quality running tandem of running backs DeAngelo Williams and Jonathan Stewart. The rushing attack eclipsed that of the previous record holder, the 2000 St. Louis Rams. In the process, Carolina became the first team in NFL history to have three players with 700 or more yards rushing in the same season: Williams with 836 yards, Stewart with 761 yards, and Newton with 706 yards. The Panthers also set the team record for net yards with 6,237, breaking the record originally set by the 2004 team.

Carolina's defense, however, was ranked last in the league, according to Football Outsiders. They allowed the fifth-most total yards in the league on defense in 2011, and the sixth-most points. Their pass defense gave up 7.6 yards per pass attempt (tied for worst in the league), and their 6.2 yards allowed per play was tied for third-worst in the league.

Offseason
Draft

 The Panthers traded its second-round selection (#33 overall) to the New England Patriots in exchange for a 2010 third round selection (#89 overall; used to select WR Armanti Edwards).
 Compensatory selection.
 The Panthers traded its original seventh-round selection (#204 overall) to the Green Bay Packers in exchange for long snapper J. J. Jansen.

Free Agency
Key Free Agent re-signings
 DE Charles Johnson: 6 years, $72 million, $30 million signing bonus.
 RB DeAngelo Williams: 5 years, $43 million, $21 million signing bonus.
 LB Jon Beason: 5 years, $50 million
 LB James Anderson: 5 years, $22 million, $8.5 million guaranteed.
 LB Thomas Davis: received a 5-year extension

Other Free Agents acquisitions
 K Olindo Mare (Seahawks): 3 years, $12 million, $4 million signing bonus.
 TE Ben Hartsock (Jets): 2 years, terms unknown
 TE Jeremy Shockey (Saints): 1 year, terms unknown
 WR Legedu Naanee (Chargers): 1 year, terms unknown
 LB Omar Gaither (Eagles): 1 year, term unknown
 TE Greg Olsen ( trade w/ Bears):  4 years, $24 million. Carolina traded a 2012 third round draft pick to acquire the tight end
 QB' Derek Anderson (Cardinals):  1 year, terms unknown]

Preseason

Schedule

Regular season

Schedule

Roster

Staff

Season summary

Week 1 at Cardinals

The Panthers opened up their regular season on the road against the Cardinals. Cam Newton came into the game amid numerous questions and after a mixed-performance 1–3 preseason. Newton surprisingly threw for 422 pass yards, an NFL record for a rookie in his first start. The Panthers came into the 3rd quarter leading 14–7, Newton having thrown 2 touchdown passes, each to Steve Smith. The Panthers came into the 4th quarter tied at 21. On a 4th & 13 at the Cardinals 47-yard line, the Panthers were forced to punt. Patrick Peterson returned the ball into the endzone for an 89-yard touchdown return. With 1:19 left, 4th and 5, at the Cardinals 6-yard line, game on the line, Cam Newton threw a short 4-yard pass to Mike Goodson which wasn't enough for the Panthers despite an amazing debut by Panthers rookie QB Cam Newton. With the loss the Panthers fell to 0–1 and lost their 3rd consecutive regular season opener.

Week 2

The Panthers' first home game of the season was a duel against the defending super bowl champions, the Green Bay Packers. Cam Newton threw for once again another 400+ yard game, becoming the first rookie ever to do so and only the 6th quarterback in NFL history to accomplish such a feat. Newton picked up where he left off against the Cardinals with an early score with 9:26 left in the 1st quarter of the game. The Panthers led 13–7 at halftime, stunning the defending Super Bowl champions. However, Green Bay came back when Aaron Rodgers threw a 49-yard touchdown pass to a wide-open Greg Jennings to put the Packers up 14–13. A big game-changer was when there was 9:31 left in the 3rd quarter of the game. Cam Newton found Steve Smith, but Smith fumbled the football and Charles Woodson picked it up. Another big game changer was on a 4th and 4 at the Packers 6-yard line with 3:23 left in the game, score being 23–16 Packers, Cam Newton tried to scramble for the first down, but was 2 yards shy. The Packers won the game, 30–23, a much closer game than expected, but the Panthers still fell to 0–2 on the season.

Week 3

    
    
    
    
    
    

The Panthers came into Week 3 in need of a win in order to save their season. This game was against the Jacksonville Jaguars, who had gone 8–8 last season and were 1–1 to start the season in 2011. The Jaguars benched Luke McCown and started rookie Blaine Gabbert after McCown's disastrous four interceptions in a devastating 32–3 loss to the New York Jets. The Panthers started the game by sacking Gabbert and getting a safety, to lead 2–0.

With the score 5–3, one of the more memorable moments during the season occurred. A heavy rain started coming down, blanketing the stadium and flooding the concrete decks. Players slipped and slid all over the place, with water going everywhere. Most dramatically, the excess water on the stadium's upper deck poured onto the lower deck which poured onto the field. Although the field had a drainage system, it was not designed for such an amount of water at once. Moments later, a Gabbert pass was picked off by Carolina's Sherrod Martin. However, for those watching the game on TV it was difficult to tell who picked the pass off or where he was. The reason was CBS' main camera feed was covered with so many raindrops that identifying specific players on the field was nearly impossible. Viewers, therefore, had to rely on the call from play-by-play announcer Spero Dedes as to what was happening on the play. Subsequent replays gave them a clearer picture.
With 0:06 left in the 1st half, Gabbert threw a 36-yard touchdown pass to Mike Thomas which was both the first career touchdown pass by Gabbert and the first touchdown pass for the Jaguars in the 2011 season. Jacksonville went up 10–5 at halftime; however, Carolina came back.

With 6:05 left in the 4th quarter, and the rain not coming down anymore although the field, players, and fans were still soaked, Cam Newton found Steve Smith for a gain of 13 yards. With 4:27 left, on a 3rd and 2, Newton found his new tight end, Greg Olsen, for a 16-yard touchdown pass to put the Panthers up 14–10. They made the 2-point conversion which put them ahead 16–10. Then, at the Panthers 35-yard line, with 0:06 remaining on the game clock, on the last play of the game, Gabbert's pass was tipped and incomplete. Not only was it the Panthers' first win of the season, it was also the first time since 2008 that they defeated an AFC team as well as the first time they won a game in September.  The win put them at 1–2.

Week 4

In order to keep their season alive, the Panthers were in need of a win against the Bears for their first 2–2 or above start since 2008. Cam Newton threw for another 374 pass yards, his highest game total for the season. Things started rough for the Panthers when Newton threw a pass to D.J. Moore which was taken back the other way for a Chicago Bears touchdown that put the Bears ahead, 10–3. With the Panthers trailing 17–10, on a 4th and 5, forced to punt, Devin Hester beat the Panthers special teams' for a 69-yard punt return, which broke the NFL record for punt return touchdowns (11). At halftime, the Panthers were trailing 24–20. The third quarter was scoreless. But in the fourth quarter, with 14:17 remaining, Jay Cutler threw a pass to Charles Godfrey for an interception which the Panthers converted into a field goal. With 1:55 left on the game clock, Panthers trailing by 1, 23–24, on a fourth-and-10 at their own 42, Cam Newton threw a deep pass to Legedu Naanee which was incomplete. Matt Forte sealed the Bears' victory on the very next play from the Bears' 43 when he ran for 40 yards down to the Panthers' 3. The Bears won, 34–29. Newton was nominated for the Pepsi Rookie Of The Week awards. With the loss, the Panthers fell to 1–3.

Week 5

    
    
    
    
    
    
    
    
    
    

The Panthers came into Week 5 again craving a win to get their season back on track. This time they were facing the former super bowl champions, the New Orleans Saints. The Saints were leading 10–0 with 3:04 left in the first quarter when Cam Newton threw a pass to wide receiver Steve Smith for a 54-yard touchdown after the touchdown Roman Harper was called for unnecessary roughness in the endzone. There was a short fight after the play, and Olindo Mare extra point try was blocked. With 4:01 left in the second quarter, the Panthers were trailing 17–6. Not when DeAngelo Williams took a left pitch from Cam Newton for a 69-yard score, Williams' first touchdown since 2009. Right before halftime, with 0:10 left, Sean Payton was trying to get the field goal unit out on the field for a John Kasay 46-yard field goal. Ron Rivera took a timeout because he thought he had too many men on the field, which cost them a field goal which put the Saints up, 20–13. With 2:36 left in the third quarter, on a 2nd and 8, score 23–20 Saints, Drew Brees was intercepted by Sherrod Martin. Off of the interception, with 12:40 left in the game, on a 3rd and goal, Newton found Greg Olsen for a 5-yard touchdown to put the Panthers up 27–23. With 0:56 left in the game, Brees threw a short pass to Pierre Thomas for a six-yard score. Saints go up, 30–27. With 0:27 left, on a fourth-and-10, Cam Newton's pass is incomplete, intended for Greg Olsen, but there was a pass interference call on Roman Harper which set up a Panthers first down. Then, on a 3rd and 12 with 0:05 remaining, Cam Newton's pass, intended for Steve Smith is incomplete. With the close loss the Panthers fell to 1–4 on the season, though only being outscored 119–132 on the season.

Week 6

With the loss, the Panthers fell to 1–5.

Week 7

The Panthers came into this game with a 1–5 record, hoping to come back and fight to stay in the race for the playoffs. The Panthers held the lead just about the whole game as Cam Newton had 256 passing yards (& tied Vince Young's record for Most Rush TD by QB in Single Season for a rookie) for a Carolina win. With the win, the Panthers rose to 2–5.

Week 8

The Panthers almost sent the game to overtime, however, Olindo Mare missed a 31-yard field goal. With the loss, the Panthers fell to 2–6 heading into their bye week.

Week 10

With the loss, the Panthers fell to 2–7.

Week 11

    
    
    
    
    
    
    
    
    
    
    
    
    

With the surprising loss, the Panthers fell to 2–8 but Cam Newton broke Vince Young's record for Most Rush TD by QB in Single Season by a rookie.

Week 12

With the win, the Panthers improved to 3–8 and secured the Colts' 0–4 record against the NFC.

Week 13

Cam Newton broke Steve Grogan's record for Most Rush TD by QB in Single Season (a record that stood for 35 years). With the win, the Panthers improved to 4–8.

Week 14

    
    
    
    
    
    
    
    
    

With their 4th straight loss to the Falcons, the Panthers fell to 4–9 securing them their second consecutive losing season.

Week 15

With the win, the Panthers improved to 5–9. Also it was the first time in franchise history they defeated the Texans.

Week 16

    
    
    
    
    
    
    
    
    
    
    

With the win, the Panthers improved to 6–9 and swept the Buccaneers.

Week 17

The Panthers lost to the Saints, 45–17, dropping their record to 6–10, instead of the hopeful 7–9. This was still an improvement from their 2–14 record last season.  The Panthers were 6–0 when Cam Newton did not have any turnovers.

Standings

Notes and references

Carolina
Carolina Panthers seasons
Carolina